Thomas Derrig (26  November 1897 – 19 November 1956) was an Irish Fianna Fáil politician who served as Minister for Lands from 1939 to 1943 and 1951 to 1954, Minister for Education from 1932 to 1939 and 1940 to 1948 and Minister for Posts and Telegraphs in September 1939. He served as a Teachta Dála (TD) from 1921 to 1923 and 1927 to 1957.

Early life and career
Derrig was born on 26 November 1897, in Westport, County Mayo, the son of Patrick Derrig and Winifred Derrig (née Sammon). He was educated locally and later at University College Galway. During his time in college he organised a corps of the Irish Volunteers. After the 1916 Easter Rising he was arrested and imprisoned, and sent to the prisons of Woking, Wormwood Scrubs and Frongoch internment camp. He was arrested in 1918, and was accused of attempting to disarm a soldier. He was sentenced to five months imprisonment by a court in Belfast. When he was released, he supported Joseph MacBride at the 1918 Irish general election. After his release, he graduated from college and became headmaster in a technical college in Mayo.

During the Irish War of Independence he was the commander of the Westport Brigade of the Irish Republican Army, before being captured and interned at the Curragh Camp. While there he was elected a Sinn Féin TD for Mayo North and West.

Derrig took the Republican/Anti-treaty side during the Irish Civil War. During the Civil War, he was an auxiliary assistant to Liam Lynch. He was later captured by the Irish Free State army. While in custody of the Criminal Investigation Department he was severely injured, having an eye shot out by CID detectives.

In 1928, he married Sinéad Mason of Ards, County Down; they had two daughters.

Political career
At the June 1927 general election he was elected to Dáil Éireann as a Fianna Fáil TD for Carlow–Kilkenny. In Éamon de Valera's first government in 1932 Derrig was appointed Minister for Education. Derrig initiated a review of industrial and reformatory schools and the rules under the Children Act 1908, resulting in the critical 1936 Cussen Report that followed which he shelved, and a report in 1946–1948 by the Irish-American priest Father Edward Flanagan, which was also shelved. His lack of action was noted in 2009 when the Ryan Report examined the subsequent management of these "residential institutions"; Derrig was the first Minister to seek a report that could have resulted in much-needed reforms. It has been suggested that he did not want to follow British law reforms in the 1920s and 1930s, because of his strong anti-British views, and that Irish children had suffered needlessly as a result. 

From 1939 to 1943, he served as Minister for Lands. He was re-appointed to Education in 1943 until 1948. During this period a bitter teachers' strike, involving the Irish National Teachers' Organisation (INTO), took place, lasting from 20 March to 30 October. Between 1951 and 1954, he became Minister for Lands again.

Thomas Derrig died in Dublin on 19 November 1956, seven days before his 59th birthday. No by-election was held for his seat.

References

External links
 Obituary, Connaught Telegraph, 24 November 1956 (Mayo County Library)

1897 births
1956 deaths
Alumni of the University of Galway
Early Sinn Féin TDs
Fianna Fáil TDs
Irish schoolteachers
Irish Republican Army (1919–1922) members
Irish Republican Army (1922–1969) members
Members of the 2nd Dáil
Members of the 3rd Dáil
Members of the 5th Dáil
Members of the 6th Dáil
Members of the 7th Dáil
Members of the 8th Dáil
Members of the 9th Dáil
Members of the 10th Dáil
Members of the 11th Dáil
Members of the 12th Dáil
Members of the 13th Dáil
Members of the 14th Dáil
Members of the 15th Dáil
Military personnel from County Mayo
Ministers for Education (Ireland)
Politicians from County Mayo